İsmail Rüştü Aksal (1911 – September 13, 1989) was a civil servant and politician in Turkey.

Biography
He was born in Pamukova  district of Sakarya Province in 1911. After graduating from the Istanbul High School in 1930 and Faculty of Political Sciences in 1933, he succeeded in equivalence exam of law. Up to 1946 he served as a civil servant in the Ministry of Finance and the Ministry of Commerce. During the World War II years he served as a finance advisor of the Turkish embassy in London. In 1946 he went into politics and he served in the Turkish parliament in 1946-1950, 1957-1960, 1961-1965 terms. In 1969 he quit politics. He served in the board of management of İş Bankası. He died on 13 September 1989 in İstanbul.

As a politician

In 1946, he joined the Republican People's Party  (CHP) and was elected as the MP from Kocaeli Province.  He quickly attracted attention as a finance expert. In the 18th government of Turkey (16 January 1949 – 22 May 1950)  he served as the Minister of Finance. During this term he reformed Turkish tax system. Upon the defeat of his party in 1950 general elections he began serving as a lawyer until 1957 when he was elected as the MP from Ankara Province. In 1959 he was elected as the secretary general of CHP with the support of İsmet İnönü, the leader of the party. His term as MP ended on 27 May 1960 by the 1960 Turkish coup d'état. But in 1961 he was appointed as a member of constituent assembly. In the same year following the end of military regime, he was reelected as an MP from Ankara Province. Although he continued to serve in the parliament, in 1962 congress of his party he didn't accept serving another term as the secretary general and he supported his friend Kemal Satır instead.  In 1965 general elections, he didn't become a candidate and in 1969  he quit politics.

References

Ministers of Finance of Turkey
Republican People's Party (Turkey) politicians
1911 births
1989 deaths
Istanbul High School alumni
Members of the 18th government of Turkey